Castle Eden railway station served the village of Castle Eden, County Durham, England, from 1839 to 1964 on the Hartlepool Dock and Railway.

History 
The station opened on 27 July 1839 by the Hartlepool Dock and Railway. It closed to passengers on 9 June 1952 and to goods on 1 June 1964. The site is now private housing.

References

External links 

Disused railway stations in County Durham
Railway stations in Great Britain opened in 1839
Railway stations in Great Britain closed in 1952
1839 establishments in England
1964 disestablishments in England
Castle Eden